Derek Edwardson (born August 26, 1981) is a retired American professional ice hockey player. He played US college hockey at Miami University and has played in the Italian Serie A.

College career 

Edwardson played junior hockey for the Danville Wings of the North American Hockey League for two seasons before committing to play college hockey for Miami University in Oxford, Ohio, in 2000. In his senior 2003–04 season, the team went 23–14–4 (.610) and qualified for the 2004 NCAA Division I Men's Ice Hockey Tournament, losing 3–2 in the regional semi-final to eventual national champions Denver at the World Arena in Colorado Springs.  The team was led by Edwardson (2nd-Team All-American, 48 points) and Gregory Hogeboom (42 points).  Edwardson was chosen as captain in his senior season, honored as team MVP, and chosen as the CCHA Player of the Year In 2017, Edwardson was inducted into the Miami University Athletics Hall of Fame.

Professional career 

Undrafted out of college, Edwardson initially spent extensive time over the next three seasons in the ECHL with the Atlantic City Boardwalk Bullies in 2004–05 (64 points) and the Las Vegas Wranglers in 2005–06 (45 points) and 2006–07 (68 points).  Edwardson elected to pursue overseas opportunities, first with Heilbronner Falken in the German DEL2 league for two years, before moving to Italy with HC Fassa for two seasons, HC Bolzano for another, and finally SG Cortina in 2012–13.  Edwardson also played for the Italian National Team at the 2012 IIHF World Championship.

Edwardson retired after the 2012–13 season.

Personal life 

Edwardson returned to his alma mater as an assistant coach with Miami in 2013–14 and is currently the hockey director of the Indianapolis Youth Hockey Association.  He lives in Indianapolis with his family.

Career statistics

Awards and achievements

References

External links

1981 births
Living people
People from Morton Grove, Illinois
Ice hockey players from Illinois
Italian ice hockey forwards
Danville Wings (NAHL) players
Miami RedHawks men's ice hockey players
Atlantic City Boardwalk Bullies players
Grand Rapids Griffins players
Bridgeport Sound Tigers players
Portland Pirates players
Las Vegas Wranglers players
Milwaukee Admirals players
Heilbronner EC players
SHC Fassa players
Bolzano HC players
SG Cortina players
AHCA Division I men's ice hockey All-Americans